The BGN/PCGN romanization of Burmese is based on the 1907 version of the Tables for the Transliteration of Burmese into English, published in 1908 by the Office of the
Superintendent, Government Printing, Rangoon, Burma. This system was adopted by the British government during colonial rule, to transcribe place names in Burma. The system does not distinguish aspirated and unaspirated consonants.

Consonant characters

Consonant character combinations

Vowel characters

References

External links
Burmese romanization
Romanization system for Burmese - BGN/PGN 1970 System

Romanization
Burmese language